Tree of Hands (released in the US as Innocent Victim) is a 1989 British psychological 
drama film directed by Giles Foster and starring Helen Shaver, Lauren Bacall, Malcolm Stoddard and Peter Firth. It is based on the 1984 novel The Tree of Hands by Ruth Rendell.

Plot
Benet Archdale (Helen Shaver), a London-based best-selling author who has just written a controversial novel, lives alone with her young son. Benet's mother, Marsha (Lauren Bacall), visiting from the United States, is a manic-depressive who has psychotic episodes. When Benet's young son dies, Marsha kidnaps a local child to serve as a substitute. Benet believes she should return the child but upon investigation she finds out that the child has been severely abused by his parents. After the child's disappearance, the parents are charged with the murder.

Cast
 Helen Shaver ...  Benet Archdale
 Lauren Bacall ...  Marsha Archdale
 Malcolm Stoddard ...  Ian Raeburn
 Peter Firth ...  Terence
 Paul McGann ...  Barry
 Kate Hardie ...  Carol
 Tony Haygarth ...  Kostas
 Phyllida Law ...  Julia
 David Schofield ...  Detective Inspector
 Amanda Dickinson ...  Molly
 Fiona McAlpine ...  Neighbour
 Julie Jupp ...  Neighbour's Daughter
 Sean Blowers ...  Detective
 Allan Mitchell ...  Consultant
 Simon Prebble ...  Newscaster
 Barnaby Brown ...  Jason
 Charles Pountney ...  James

References

External links

1989 films
1980s psychological drama films
Films shot at EMI-Elstree Studios
Films based on British novels
British psychological drama films
Works by Ruth Rendell
1989 drama films
Films directed by Giles Foster
1980s English-language films
1980s British films